Luella Gear (September 5, 1897 – April 3, 1980) was an American actress. She appeared in numerous films, TV series and theatrical productions throughout the 1910s to the 1960s

Early life
Gear was born in New York in 1897. She attended the Spence School and was educated in Brussels, Belgium.

Career
She made her acting debut in 1917, appearing in the Broadway musical Love O' Mike. She subsequently appeared in Broadway productions such as The Gold Diggers, A Dangerous Maid, Poppy, The Optimists, Gay Divorce and Life Begins at 8:40.

During World War II, she toured with the wartime comedy play Count Me In as part of the USO, entertaining the troops.

She also appeared in films like Queen High, Carefree, Lady in the Dark, The Perfect Marriage and Jigsaw and TV series like Broadway Television Theatre, The Big Story, The Elgin Hour and Joe and Mabel.

Personal life
Gear was married three times: to New York playboy Byron Chandler, aviator Gustave Maurice Heckscher, and Frederick W.A. Engel. She had no children.

Gear died in The Bronx on April 3, 1980 at the age of 82. She was buried at Woodlawn Cemetery.

Selected filmography

Film
 Adam and Eva (1923) as Julie Dewitt
 Carefree (1938) as Aunt Cora
 The Perfect Marriage (1947) as Dolly Haggerty
 Jigsaw (1949) as Pet Shop Owner
 Phffft (1954) as Edith Chapman

Television
 The Trap - "Chocolate Cobweb" (1950), TV episode
 Sure as Fate - "Tremolo" (1950), TV episode
 The Web - "Death Mask" (1952), TV episode
 Broadway Television Theatre - "The Patsy" (1952), TV episode, as Ma Harrington
 The Big Story - "Arthur Mielke of the Washington Times Herald" (1954), TV episode, as Mrs. Ferill
 The Elgin Hour - "Falling Star" (1954), TV episode, as Mom Morton
 Producers' Showcase - "Happy Birthday" (1956), TV episode, as Emma
 Joe and Mabel - "Joe's Bankbook" (1956), TV episode, as Mrs. Spooner
 Play of the Week - "Juno and the Paycock" (1960), TV episode
 The Defenders - "The Search" (1962), TV episode, as Mrs. Carney and "Conflict of Interests" (1964), TV episode, as Delia Leary

Selected stage credits
Love O' Mike (1917)
The Gold Diggers (1919)
Elsie (1923)
Poppy (1923)
Queen High (1926)
Gay Divorce (1932)
Life Begins at 8:40 (1934)
On Your Toes (1936)
Sabrina Fair (1953)

References

External links
 
 
 

1897 births
1980 deaths
American film actresses
American silent film actresses
American television actresses
American stage actresses
People from New York City
20th-century American actresses
Spence School alumni